Gamini Wijesuriya is a Sri Lankan architect and archaeologist, known for being a specialist in heritage management.

Early life
Wijesuriya was born in Kurunegala District and completed his education at Nagollagoda Maha Vidyalaya and Nalanda College, Colombo. After graduating from the University of Moratuwa with a Bachelor of Science and a Master's degree in architecture, he began his career as a conservation architect. Wijesuriya went on to earn a Master's degree in archeology and heritage management from the University of York and another Master's degree in historic preservation from the Carnegie Mellon University. He later obtained his PhD from Leiden University, where he presented his dissertation on "Buddhist Meditation Monasteries in Ancient Sri Lanka".

Career
Wijesuriya joined the field of archaeology and conservation as Project Manager of the Sri Lanka Cultural Triangle Project. He then served on the Department of Archaeology for 18 years as Assistant Commissioner (architect), Deputy Commissioner (architect) and Director (architectural conservation). He went on to serve as the Principal Regional Scientist in the Department of Conservation of New Zealand. He later joined ICCROM as the first Asian professional to join its service. Wijesuriya currently acts as a Special Advisor to the ICCROM Director General and a Special Advisor to the Director of WHITRAP Shanghai.

Recognition

 ICCROM 2021 Heritage award.

References

External links 
 Dr. Gamini Wijesuriya
 Dr Gamini Wijesuriya
 Gamini Wijesuriya - Honorary Senior Lecturer

Sinhalese architects
Sri Lankan Buddhists
Alumni of Nalanda College, Colombo
20th-century Sri Lankan architects
Year of birth missing (living people)
Living people